Elaeocarpus moratii is a species of flowering plant in the Elaeocarpaceae family. It is found only in New Caledonia.

References

moratii
Endemic flora of New Caledonia
Vulnerable plants
Taxonomy articles created by Polbot